The Croatian Democratic Union 1990 (abbreviated HDZ 1990) is a political party of Croats in Bosnia and Herzegovina. It split from the Croatian Democratic Union of Bosnia and Herzegovina and is led by Ilija Cvitanović. In 2006, it was the leading member of the Croats Together (Hrvatsko zajedništvo) coalition.

On 12 September 2014, the HDZ 1990 was admitted as an observer member to the European People's Party.

Elections

Parliamentary elections

Presidency elections

Cantonal elections

See also
Croatian Democratic Union of Bosnia and Herzegovina
Croatian Democratic Union

References

External links
Official website

Conservative parties in Bosnia and Herzegovina
Croatian Democratic Union
Croatian nationalist parties
Croat political parties in Bosnia and Herzegovina
History of the Croats of Bosnia and Herzegovina
Pro-European political parties in Bosnia and Herzegovina